Big Tancook Island Elementary School is a public school in Big Tancook Island, Nova Scotia. It is one of Canada's last one-room school houses. There were sixteen students enrolled at the school for the 2021-22 term.

References

1820 establishments in Canada
Educational institutions established in 1820
Schools in Nova Scotia